This is a list of rural localities in Sverdlovsk Oblast. Sverdlovsk Oblast (Sverdlovskaya oblast) is a federal subject (an oblast) of Russia located in the Ural Federal District. Its administrative center is the city of Yekaterinburg, formerly known as Sverdlovsk. Its population is 4,297,747 (according to the 2010 Census).

Locations 
 Abramovo

 Asbestovsky
 Averino
 Baranchinsky
 Baybulda
 Baykalovo
 Gerasimovka
 Isetskoye
 Kakvinskie Pechi
 Lobva
 Pelym
 Sagra
 Tabory
 Turinskaya Sloboda

See also 
 
 Lists of rural localities in Russia

References 

Sverdlovsk Oblast